The Lost Tape is a mixtape by American rapper 50 Cent. The mixtape, hosted by DJ Drama, is 50 Cent's first "Gangsta Grillz" mixtape. It was released as a free download on May 22, 2012.

Background
The Lost Tape, released as promotion for his fifth studio album Street King Immortal (2013), includes guest appearances from Snoop Dogg, Eminem, Jeremih, 2 Chainz, Hayes, Robbie Nova, Ned the Wino, along with newly signed G-Unit artists Kidd Kidd and Precious Paris. It was produced by 45 Music, Tone Mason, AraabMuzik, DJ Spinz, Mike Will, G Sparkz, Chris N Teeb, 8track, Kon Hathaway, Slimm Gemm, Illmind, Swiff D, Dready and Jake One

Release and promotion

Music videos
The first music video, was for "Riot (Remix)", a remix to a 2 Chainz song. The second video was released on May 25. "Murder One" (or "Shady Murder SK Energy Drink #9"), with Eminem's intro, shot on the same location as "Riot Remix". On June 5, "Get Busy" was released on his YouTube account. On June 8, the "All His Love" video was released. The "O.J." video was released on June 11. The official video for "Double Up" was released on June 19 and features Floyd Mayweather's Money Team member Hayes. On June 25, the video for "Complicated", a remastered version of "SK Energy Track #8", was released. The video for "I Ain't Gonna Lie" was released on July 2, 2012.

Track listing

References

Further reading
 Grab 50 Cent's Star-Studded 'The Lost Tape' Mixtape | SPIN | SPIN Mix | Songs
 50 Cent And DJ Drama Craft Street Music For Lost Tape - Music, Celebrity, Artist News | MTV.com
 10 Best Lines From 50 Cent's "The Lost Tape" | Vibe
 Young Buck Weighs in on 50 Cent's The Lost Tape | News | BET
 Mixtape Daily: 50 Cent Taps Eminem For 'Murder One' On Lost Tape

2012 mixtape albums
50 Cent albums
DJ Drama albums
Albums produced by Jake One
Albums produced by AraabMuzik
Albums produced by Illmind
Albums produced by Tone Mason
Albums produced by Mike Will Made It